Zenobia is a 1768 tragedy by the Irish writer Arthur Murphy. It is based on the life of Zenobia, ruler of the Palmyrene Empire in Syria and her defiance of Ancient Rome.

The original Drury Lane cast included Ann Street Barry as Zenobia, Spranger Barry as Rhadamistus, Charles Holland as Teribarzus, Francis Aickin as Pharasmanes, William Havard as Megistus, John Hayman Packer as Zopiron and Richard Hurst as Tigranes.

References

Bibliography
 Nicoll, Allardyce. A History of English Drama 1660–1900: Volume III. Cambridge University Press, 2009.
 Hogan, C.B (ed.) The London Stage, 1660–1800: Volume V. Southern Illinois University Press, 1968.
 Southern, Pat. Empress Zenobia: Palmyra’s Rebel Queen. A&C Black, 2008.

1768 plays
Tragedy plays
West End plays
Plays by Arthur Murphy